Namiquipa is one of the 67 municipalities of Chihuahua, in northern Mexico. The municipal seat lies at Namiquipa. 

As of 2010, the municipality had a total population of 22,880, up from 20,314 as of 2005. 

As of 2010, the town of Namiquipa had a population of 1,752, up from 1,718 as of 2005.  Other than the town of Namiquipa, the municipality had 363 localities, the largest of which (with 2010 populations in parentheses) were: Santa Ana (2,978), classified as urban, and El Terrero (2,621), El Molino (2,176), Benito Juárez (1,967), classified as urban, and Cruces (1,206), and Independencia (Cologachi) (1,088), classified as rural.

References

Municipalities of Chihuahua (state)